San Miguel de Cauri District is one of seven districts of the Lauricocha Province in Peru.

Geography 
The Rawra mountain range traverses the district. Some of the highest mountains of the district are listed below:

 Ch'uspiqucha
 Kuntur Wachanan
 Parya Qayqu
 Puywanqucha
 Qayqu Anka

See also 
 Lawriqucha
 Lawriqucha River
 Patarqucha
 Qarwaqucha
 Tampuqucha
 Tawlliqucha
 T'inkiqucha

References